Jasper Schendelaar (born 2 September 2000) is a Dutch professional footballer who plays as a goalkeeper for Eerste Divisie club PEC Zwolle.

Club career
Schendelaar made his Eerste Divisie debut for Jong AZ on 24 August 2018 in a game against Cambuur, as a starter.

On 8 June 2020, AZ agreed to loan out Schendelaar to SC Telstar for the 2020–21 season.

On 12 June 2021, he signed a two-year contract with PEC Zwolle. A backup to Kostas Lamprou during his first season at the club, Schendelaar was chosen as the new starter in goal ahead of the 2022–23 season. He made his debut for the club on 7 August 2022, the first matchday of the season, in a 2–1 win against De Graafschap.

International career
He was the starting goalkeeper for Netherlands national under-17 football team at the 2017 UEFA European Under-17 Championship, as Netherlands were eliminated by Germany in the quarterfinal.

References

External links
 

Living people
2000 births
Sportspeople from Alkmaar
Association football goalkeepers
Dutch footballers
Netherlands youth international footballers
AZ Alkmaar players
Jong AZ players
SC Telstar players
PEC Zwolle players
Eerste Divisie players
Footballers from North Holland